Polyozus is a synonym for two genera:

 Leptidolon, a genus of plant bug
 Psychotria, a genus of flowering plant